The  Masonic Hall in  Waynesville, North Carolina is a historic Masonic Lodge constructed in 1927 as a meeting hall for a local area Masonic Lodge.  

It was listed on the National Register of Historic Places in 1988.

It is a three-story, Classical Revival style steel frame and brick building.  The Masons lost the building through bankruptcy in 1930.  The building was renovated in 1973.

It is also a contributing building in the Waynesville Main Street Historic District.

At a later date it was a private club and catering venue named "Gateway Club".

Haywood County Register of Deeds records show that on April 12, 2019, Mandir Street LLC purchased the building for an estimated $885,000. The company, owned by Shan Arora and Satish Shah and named for a Hindi word that refers to the Church Street address, planned to use the building in a similar manner to the Gateway Club while respecting the history.

The Three Seven is now a meeting and venue space offering Mason Hall on the first floor, Suites at the Three Seven on the second floor with offices for professional meetings, and the Grand Ballroom on the third floor.

References

Clubhouses on the National Register of Historic Places in North Carolina
Neoclassical architecture in North Carolina
Masonic buildings completed in 1927
Buildings and structures in Haywood County, North Carolina
Former Masonic buildings in North Carolina
National Register of Historic Places in Haywood County, North Carolina
Historic district contributing properties in North Carolina
Waynesville, North Carolina